The Fritz Von Erich Retirement Show was a major professional wrestling show held by World Class Championship Wrestling (WCCW) at the Texas Stadium on June 4, 1982. As the name indicates the show marked Fritz Von Erich's retirement from in ring competition after 29 years of active competition. His retirement came shortly after his promotion "Big Time Wrestling" was renamed "World Class Championship Wrestling" as they were making an attempt to expand to a national promotion. In the main event Fritz Von Erich defeated King Kong Bundy to win the NWA American Heavyweight Championship. After the match Von Erich vacated the American Heavyweight Championship. The show featured a total of nine matches. On the show David and Kevin Von Erich lost the WCCW All-Asia Tag Team Championship, which is not to be mistaken for the All Asia Tag Team Championship.

Results

References

1982 in professional wrestling
World Class Championship Wrestling shows
Events in Texas
1982 in Texas
Professional wrestling in the Dallas–Fort Worth metroplex
June 1982 events in the United States